Highwind may refer to:
Highwinds Network Group, also called Highwinds, a content delivery company
Cid Highwind, a character in Final Fantasy VII
Highwind, a fictional airship in Final Fantasy VII (see Gameplay of Final Fantasy#Airships and transport)
Aranea Highwind, fictional character in Final Fantasy XV